Arkansas Highway 84 (AR 84, Hwy. 84) is a designation for two state highways in west Arkansas. The eastern segment is 85.8 miles long and travels from US 278 in Umpire to U.S. 270B in Malvern.

Route description

Major intersections

Western segment

Eastern segment

See also

References

External links

84
Transportation in Polk County, Arkansas
Transportation in Howard County, Arkansas
Transportation in Pike County, Arkansas
Transportation in Clark County, Arkansas
Transportation in Hot Spring County, Arkansas